Kinetic diameter is a measure applied to atoms and molecules that expresses the likelihood that a molecule in a gas will collide with another molecule.  It is an indication of the size of the molecule as a target.  The kinetic diameter is not the same as atomic diameter defined in terms of the size of the atom's electron shell, which is generally a lot smaller, depending on the exact definition used.  Rather, it is the size of the sphere of influence that can lead to a scattering event.

Kinetic diameter is related to the mean free path of molecules in a gas.  Mean free path is the average distance that a particle will travel without collision.  For a fast moving particle (that is, one moving much faster than the particles it is moving through) the kinetic diameter is given by,

where,
d is the kinetic diameter,
r is the kinetic radius, r = d/2,
l is the mean free path, and
n is the number density of particles

However, a more usual situation is that the colliding particle being considered is indistinguishable from the population of particles in general.  Here, the Maxwell–Boltzmann distribution of energies must be considered, which leads to the modified expression,

List of diameters
The following table lists the kinetic diameters of some common molecules;

Dissimilar particles
Collisions between two dissimilar particles occur when a beam of fast particles is fired into a gas consisting of another type of particle, or two dissimilar molecules randomly collide in a gas mixture. For such cases, the above formula for scattering cross section has to be modified. 

The scattering cross section, σ, in a collision between two dissimilar particles or molecules is defined by the sum of the kinetic diameters of the two particles,

where.
r1, r2 are, half the kinetic diameter (ie, the kinetic radii) of the two particles, respectively.

We define an intensive quantity, the scattering coefficient α, as the product of the gas number density and the scattering cross section,

The mean free path is the inverse of the scattering coefficient,

For similar particles, r1 = r2 and,

as before.

References

Bibliography
Breck, Donald W., "Zeolite Molecular Sieves: Structure, Chemistry, and Use", New York: Wiley, 1974 .
Freude, D., Molecular Physics, chapter 2, 2004 unpublished draft, retrieved and archived 18 October 2015.
Ismail, Ahmad Fauzi; Khulbe, Kailash; Matsuura, Takeshi, Gas Separation Membranes: Polymeric and Inorganic, Springer, 2015 .
Joos, Georg; Freeman, Ira Maximilian, Theoretical Physics, Courier Corporation, 1958 .
Li, Jian-Min; Talu, Orhan, "Effect of structural heterogeneity on multicomponent adsorption: benzene and p-xylene mixture on silicalite", in Suzuki, Motoyuki (ed), Fundamentals of Adsorption, pp. 373-380, Elsevier, 1993 .
Matteucci, Scott; Yampolskii, Yuri; Freeman, Benny D.; Pinnau, Ingo, "Transport of gases and vapors in glassy and rubbery polymers" in, Yampolskii, Yuri; Freeman, Benny D.; Pinnau, Ingo, Materials Science of Membranes for Gas and Vapor Separation, pp. 1-47, John Wiley & Sons, 2006 .

Molecular physics